Marcovia is a municipality in the Honduran department of Choluteca, on the Gulf of Fonseca.

History 
Marcovia was called Pueblo Nuevo until 1882 when it became a municipality and was renamed Marcovia by the president, Marco Aurelio Soto. The majority of the people in Marcovia used to be from El Salvador.

Demographics 
According to the 2013 census, 53% of the population works in agriculture. Fifty-five percent use some type of private water system, and 48% uses public electricity to light their houses. Eighty-four percent use firewood for cooking and 13% of houses have at least one car. Eighty percent of Morolica has a basic education level.

Geography 
Marcovia has 20 Villages (Aldeas) and 140 Hamlets.

References

Municipalities of the Choluteca Department